ITEEM (Institut technologique européen d'entrepreneuriat et de management) is a French institute created as a joint venture between École centrale de Lille, a graduate engineering school, and Skema Business School (Issued from CERAM Business School and ESC Lille graduate school of management).  
It is dedicated to entrepreneurship education.

ITEEM was established in 2003 and operates as a department of École centrale de Lille.
It enrolls undergraduate students for a 5-year courses towards a master's degree, the title of « Ingénieurs Managers Entrepreneurs » (Engineers, Managers, Entrepreneurs).

ITEIt is situated on the campus of Lille University of Science and Technology.

External links
  ITEEM
  ITEEM
  École centrale de Lille
  Ecole Supérieure de Commerce de Lille

ITEEM
ITEEM
University of Lille Nord de France
Educational institutions established in 2003
2003 establishments in France